

Hans Hahne (30 November 1894 – MIA as of 24 June 1944) was a German officer in the Wehrmacht during World War II who commanded the 197th Infantry Division. He was a recipient of the Knight's Cross of the Iron Cross of Nazi Germany.

Hahne went missing in action on 26 June 1944 near Vitebsk during the Soviet Vitebsk–Orsha Offensive of Operation Bagration; he was posthumously promoted to the rank of Generalmajor.

Awards and decorations

 Knight's Cross of the Iron Cross on 10 February 1942 as Oberst and commander of Infanterie-Regiment 507.

See also
List of people who disappeared

References

Citations

Bibliography

 
 
 

1894 births
1944 deaths
Major generals of the German Army (Wehrmacht)
German Army personnel of World War I
Prussian Army personnel
German Army personnel killed in World War II
Recipients of the clasp to the Iron Cross, 1st class
Recipients of the Gold German Cross
Recipients of the Knight's Cross of the Iron Cross
Military personnel from Berlin
People from the Province of Brandenburg
Missing in action of World War II